Gettysburg and Petersburg Turnpike, in addition to the original turnpike road, may refer to:
Baltimore Pike (Adams County, Pennsylvania), the designation for the remaining unnumbered portion of the Gettysburg and Petersburg Turnpike.
Gettysburg and Petersburg Turnpike Company, the corporation that built and operated the turnpike.
Pennsylvania Route 97 (Adams County), which is the southern portion of the former Gettysburg and Petersburg Turnpike.
U.S. Route 140, a former US Highway designation—the northern portion of which had been the Gettysburg and Petersburg Turnpike.